Jogada is a village development committee in Rupandehi District in Lumbini Province of southern Nepal. At the time of the 1991 Nepal census it had a population of 3867 people living in 626 individual households.

References

Populated places in Rupandehi District